Golmaal Jr.  is an Indian animated television series created by Rohit Shetty, based on the comedy film series Golmaal. The show is available in Hindi, Bengali, Marathi, Tamil, Malayalam, Gujarati, Telugu and Kannada. It premiered on Nickelodeon Sonic on 13 May 2019 as one of the first originals of Nickelodeon Sonic.

The show showcases the story of two rival prank gangs of children, headed by Gopal and Madhav.

Broadcast

Synopsis 
The show centres on the adventures of Gopal and Madhav two mischievous rivals with their own partners, who encourage their gangs to play pranks on the other which often result in fun, drama and chaos, while their school peon Pappi always tried to find proof and bust five of them in front of school principal Mr. Patwardhan but fails every time, and gets into trouble.

Characters

Main characters 
 Gopal - Gopal Kumar Santoshi (known as simply Gopu) or Gopal is a fourteen-year-old boy who is well built, smart, bold, confident and strong. Sajeev and Soniya's son. All the children fear him, except Madhav. He enjoys picking fights and irritating Madhav as he knows that Madhav wants to be ahead of him in everything. Gopal's weakness is that he is afraid of the dark, something that Madhav, Laxman 2 and Lucky take advantage of. His second weakness is that he goes into a trance when anyone points their index finger at him and must forcefully twirls them around to get out of it. Laxman 1 is part of his team. He is the hero of the show and competes with Madhav's gang. He loves sports and loves challenges. He is voiced by Viral B. Shah in the voice of Ajay Devgan.
 Madhav - Madhav Singh Ghai or Madhav is also a 14-year-old boy. Captain Gajodhar and Munmun's son. He is not as strong as Gopal and considers him as his rival, but thinks he is no less and wants to be ahead of Gopal in everything even if it is by unfair means. But he secretly admirers Gopal. Even though he tries acting confident, he goofs up as he is nervous and confused. Madhav however can easily be influenced by others so Lucky and Laxman 2 keep inflating his ego and create fights with Gopal. He however is not afraid of the dark. So, at night Gopal becomes ‘Zero’ and Madhav becomes 'Hero'. Madhav is also quite smart and often his interesting plans, ideas, quick-thinking helps the Golmaal crew in tight situations. Laxman 2 and Lucky is part of his team. He is also the hero of the show and is always competing with Gopal and Laxman 1. He loves to chill and loves to challenge Gopal. He is voiced by Shanoor Mirza in the voice of Arshad Warsi.
 Lucky - Lucky Gill or Lucky is a twelve-year-old boy (thirteen-year-old after Vasooli's Birthday Wish) and is a part of Madhav's team. He is short, plump and always has a lollypop in his mouth, which results in a “hmmmmm hmm hmmm” coupled with gestures. Only Madhav and Laxman 2 can interpret him. He is always silently tagging along and does not participate in gang fights. He always provides Madhav and Laxman 2 with brilliant ideas and solutions. He is often underestimated, however they are unaware that once the lollypop is pulled out, he becomes furious. He is voiced by Nilufer Middey Khan in the voice of Tushar Kapoor.
 Laxman 1 - Laxman Prasad or Laxman 1 is a thirteen-year-old boy. He blindly follows Gopal, while addressing him as ‘Gopu’. He speaks with a lisp and likes to repeat his words in English. He is aware with things happening around and always passes on good information to Gopal. He is also aware about Gopal's fear of the dark and consoles him, especially from Madhav and gang. He is tech savvy, good at academics and languages. He is part of Gopal's team. He is also quite good in languages and other studies but mostly fails due to his nervousness. He wears a yellow shirt and circular glasses. He is mostly shown fighting with Madhav's friend Laxman 2. He is voiced by Romir Chemburkar in the voice of Shreyas Talpade.
 Laxman 2 - Laxman Sharma or Laxman 2 is a thirteen-year-old boy (fourteen-year-old after Mama No 1) who is in Madhav's team. Like Gopal and Madhav, Laxman 2 always loggerheads with Laxman 1 and often tease him with his lisp. In any situation he concludes that they will fail and starts weeping. His negative comments are mean and rhyming, which makes Madhav nervous and makes Lucky giggle. However his negative comments always give rise to clues that help the boys in finding a solution to their problem. Owing to his chronic cold, he is always sneezing and sniffling. He wears a blue T-shirt with a full sleeve. He can understand Lucky's talking/language. Sometimes, he makes many kinds of funny rhymes while speaking. He is always by Madhav's side and mostly shown fighting with Gopal's friend Laxman 1. He is voiced by Amaan Shaikh in the voice of Kunal Khemu.

Other characters 
 Pappi - Pappi Boss or Pappi is a 31-year-old cunning peon and a servant of Patwardhan Sir. His sole mission is to gather proof of the five children engaged in bizarre feats with Vasooli. However always due to some unexpected funny accident, he is never able to gather proof.Due to this, he gets into trouble, and is mostly scolded by Mr. Patwardhan. He also blames the students although if they did not do anything notorious rarely.The sound of a school bell makes him go cuckoo. If he hears it, he suddenly pops out from wherever he is hiding and starts dancing. He is voiced by Anamaya Verma in the voice of Johnny Lever.
 Mr. Patwardhan - He is about 60 years old. He is the principal of Golden hills high school. He is very strict and expects his students to follow his military like rules. However he is quite a jovial man as well. He is very impressed with Gopal and Madhav as he feels that they excel in everything they do. His enemies are Vasooli, Vasu Dhasu, Principal Pangeshwar and Moochi Pahalwan. He is unaware of their rivalry and thinks they make a fantastic team. The boys are also cautious not to reveal their rivalry because they do not want to get punished, as well as the fear of being expelled from school and do not want to break his trust.He has a weakness for desi sweets. He hides them in different boxes all over his office. When he gets angry, his left eye starts winking uncontrollably. He is voiced by Vinod Kulkarni.
Vasooli - Vasooli (commonly known as Vasooli Bhai) is a resourceful 19½-year-old man. He begins a new business in every episode. Vasooli seems tough but he is also soft at heart, emotional, and dumb. Children never return their dues on time. He is the enemy of Patwardhan Sir and Pappi and thought as useless by them. He is voiced by Nitin Kakkar in the voice of Mukesh Tiwari. Vasooli's character is inspired from the real-life Vasooli Bhai Heer Singh and his boss Kalidas.
 Milli - Milli Khatte or Milli is another student of the class. She is 14½ years old. Gopal and Madhav collectively have a crush on her. They always tried to impress her but Milli is not impressed by them and thinks they are losers. Milli is generally impressed by Lucky. But sometimes Gopal and Madhav impress her. She is voiced by Sumriddhhi Shukla.
 Bomb - Bomb is a brown-coloured pet dog of Milli. When anyone hears his name, they get scared.
 Distinction - Distinction is a rarely seen character who is Gopal's and Madhav's classmate. He is good at studies, especially in science and maths. He is mostly troubled by Gopal and Madhav's pranks.
 Vasu Dhasu - Vasu Dhasu is an enemy of Golden Hills High School, five students and principal Patwardhan. He repeatedly keeps an eye on the school so that he can steal its property documents and build his shop on the school's land but fails due to Gopal and Madhav.
 Pandu - Pandu is the snake man who attacks Gopal and Madhav by acting like a snake but his weakness is getting opposed by the five students playing snake flute. He is the enemy of five students. he is voiced by (Saumya Daan).
 Peter and Repeater - Peter and Repeater are the education ministers. They will lock up a school if they find something wrong. They carry heavy padlocks with them and 5-star certificates. They give 5-star certificates to principals of the good schools. Repeater always repeats whatever Peter says.
 Nonsense Sir - He is the Maths teacher of Golden hills school who is short unlike the others and needs a ladder to write on the board. He keeps repeating the word "Nonsense" and is short-tempered.
 Sci-Fi Sir - He is the science teacher of the school who forgets certain things due to his old age. He makes some kinds of gadgets which Madhav, Laxman 2, and Lucky think of misusing it especially in "Invisible Gadget".
 Jagoo - Jagoo (known as simply Jagz) is a fat glutton in the school.
 Moochi Pahalwaan - He is the enemy of Patwardhan sir. He used to be the servant of Patwardhan Sir, but his job ended for some reason. He also has two bodyguards.
 Zero - Zero is the thief who is hired by Vasu Dhasu to steal the properties but always fails. His catchphrase is 'Naam Hai Zero, Kaam Mein Hero'. He always fails because of Gopal and Madhav in the episode 'Patangbaazi'.
  Mayor Chatalal - He is the mayor. He always has his umbrella near him.
  Siti-PT Sir - He is the sports teacher of Golden Hills High School. He always has his whistle near him. He is voiced by Manoj Pandey in the voice of Asrani.
  Rupvati - She is the cow of Pappi. She gets lost at times.
 Inspector Dandey - He is the police inspector.
 Constable Gandhari - He is a constable of Inspector Dandey.
Pandit Bhusbhusji - He is a singing artist who sings the songs with very loud voice that is why no one can hear his song for long time. He is seen in Episode 2 for the first time.
 Captain Gajodhar - He is father of Madhav and a Brigadier.
 Sajeev - He is father of Gopal and a good chef.
 Munmun - She is mother of Madhav and a good animal doctor.
 Soniya - She is mother of Gopal and a good sports woman.
 Pangeshwar - He is the principal of Triumph School which is the rival school of Golden Hills High School. He is also the enemy of Principal Patwardhan.
  Mama No.1 - He is the uncle of Laxman 2 who appears in the episode "Mama No.1".
  Late Miss Briganza - She was the first, former and deceased principal of Golden Hills High School.

Episodes

Mobile Game 
A mobile game for Golmaal Jr. was released on 10 May 2019 by Zapak. The game is an endless cycling game where you have to play as Gopal, Madhav, the Laxmans, or Lucky to stop Pappi from showing proof to the principal.

See also
 Rohit Shetty Picturez
 Little Singham

References

External links 
 

2019 Indian television series debuts
Indian children's animated comedy television series
Indian television spin-offs
Indian television shows based on films
Nickelodeon India
Hindi-language Nickelodeon original programming